Surat is a principal business hub of the Indian state Gujarat, the eighth largest city and ninth largest urban agglomeration. Surat is the 2nd cleanest city of India. and fastest growing city of the world  Surat is also famous for its food, besides being the hub of diamonds and textiles in India, and one of the country's oldest cities.

Historical monuments
Surat has many Historical monuments and tourist places in Surat. Some of them are:
 Heritage Square

Forts
 Surat Castle

Museums
 Saraswati Mandir – a house museum of Gujarati poet Narmad

Beaches, dams and lakes

 Suvali Beach
 Dumas Beach
 Umbharat Beach
 Ukai Dam
 Gopi Talav

Amusements, parks and zoos
Sarthana Nature Park
Jagdishchandra Bose Aquarium
Science Centre
Amaazia

Libraries
 Andrews Library
 Nanpura Parsi Library
 Kavi Narmad Central Library

Malls and markets
 Chauta Bazaar

Places of worship

Temples
Chintamani Jain Temple
Shree Shyam Mandir, Surat Dham ambaji Mandir

Churches 
 Anglican Church

Other points of interest
Bedkuvadoor
Bhadbhuja
Bhagal
Bhavanivad
Gaurav Path
Tapi Riverfront
Wier-cum causeway

References

Surat
 
Surat
Surat